Bentspoke Brewing Co is a Canberra-based brewing company initially founded as a Brewpub in 2014 by brewers Richard Watkins and Tracy Margrain. Bentspoke now supports both a Brewpub in the central Canberra suburb of Braddon, and a commercial brewing and canning facility in the Canberra light-industrial estate of Mitchell.  Bentspoke's commercially available canned beers sport a bike theme (as does the company's name).

Bentspoke have historically performed well in the yearly Australian GABS Hottest 100 Aussie Craft Beers of the Year awards, with their Crankshaft IPA taking out the top spot in both 2021 and 2022. They were also the only Australian brewery to secure a champion's trophy at the 2019 International Brewing Awards.

In 2019 Bentspoke partnered with the Canberra Innovation Network to brew The Innovator, a sustainable beer incorporating wild yeast, pear juice and dried  edible insects (crickets and black soldier fly larvae) "aiming to highlight innovation and test the possibilities of brewing using local and environmentally friendly ingredients".

Beers

 "Crankshaft" IPA (5.8% alc/vol)
 "Barley Griffin" Canberra Pale Ale (4.2% alc/vol)
 "Sprocket" IPA (6.7% alc/vol)
 "Red Nut" Red IPA (7.0% alc/vol)
 "Easy" Cleansing Ale (3.2% alc/vol)
 "Mort's Gold" Lager (4.4% alc/vol)
 "Cluster8" Imperial IPA (8.8% alc/vol)
 "Big Nut" Black IPA (7.0% alc/vol)
 "Resonate" ("collaboration with local music artists SAFIA") (4.5% alc/vol)
 "How's it Gosen" Tropical Gose (4.0% alc/vol)

Bentspoke also produce a number of seasonal beers such as the "Flemm" Flanders Red Ale (5.0% alc/vol)
and the "Descent" Russian Imperial Stout (15+% alc/vol).

Awards 
In March 2019, Bentspoke won two medals at the International Brewing Awards in London, a gold medal for their "Barley Griffin" Pale Ale and a silver medal for their "Crankshaft" IPA. This was the second time in a row that Bentspoke had been awarded a gold and a silver medal at the show.

In May 2019, Bentspoke's "Barley Griffin" Pale Ale was also awarded the "Small Pack Ale Champion's Trophy" at the International Brewing Awards.

In May 2021, Bentspoke's "Sprocket" IPA was awarded the "Best Traditional IPA Trophy" at the Australian International Beer Awards.

See also 

 Beer in Australia
 List of breweries in Australia

References

External links 
 

Australian beer brands
Australian companies established in 2014
Food and drink companies established in 2014
Companies based in Canberra